Paşaköy is a Turkish word meaning "village of the pasha" and may refer to:

Villages in Turkey
 Paşaköy, Alanya, Antalya Province
 Paşaköy, Ayvacık, Çanakkale Province
 Paşaköy, Çankırı, Çankırı Province
 Paşaköy, Çorum, Çorum Province
 Paşaköy, İpsala
 Paşaköy, Taşköprü, Kastamonu province
 Paşaköy, Vezirköprü, Samsun Province
 Paşaköy, Yenipazar, Aydın Province
 Paşaköy, Yüreğir, Adana Province

Villages elsewhere
 Paşaköy, Famagusta, aka Askeia, Famagusta district, Cyprus